Kostyantyn Anatoliyovych Kulyk (born 14 June 1970) is a former Ukrainian professional footballer.

Club career
He made his professional debut in the Soviet Second League in 1989 for FC Tighina Bender. He played one game in the UEFA Champions League 2000–01 qualification for FC Zimbru Chişinău.

Honours
 Ukrainian Premier League runner-up: 1995.
 Ukrainian Premier League bronze: 1992, 1993, 1994.
 Moldovan National Division champion: 1994, 1998, 1999.
 Russian Cup finalist: 1995.

References

1970 births
Footballers from Odesa
Living people
Soviet footballers
Ukrainian footballers
Association football midfielders
FC Tighina players
FC Zimbru Chișinău players
Kapaz PFK players
SKA Odesa players
Neftçi PFK players
FC Chornomorets Odesa players
FC Rotor Volgograd players
FC Dynamo Stavropol players
FC Metallurg Lipetsk players
FC Chornomorets-2 Odesa players
FC Dnister Ovidiopol players
Russian Premier League players
Ukrainian Premier League players
Ukrainian First League players
Moldovan Super Liga players
Ukrainian expatriate footballers
Expatriate footballers in Russia
Expatriate footballers in Moldova